Amina Bettiche (born 14 December 1987) is an Algerian steeplechase runner.  Bettiche won the gold medal at the 2013 Mediterranean Games. In 2017, she competed in the women's 3000 metres steeplechase event at the 2017 World Championships in Athletics held in London, United Kingdom. She did not advance to compete in the final.

International competitions

See also
 Algeria at the 2013 Mediterranean Games

References

External links
 

1987 births
Living people
Algerian female steeplechase runners
Algerian female long-distance runners
Algerian female cross country runners
Olympic athletes of Algeria
Athletes (track and field) at the 2016 Summer Olympics
World Athletics Championships athletes for Algeria
Mediterranean Games gold medalists for Algeria
Athletes (track and field) at the 2013 Mediterranean Games
Athletes (track and field) at the 2022 Mediterranean Games
Mediterranean Games medalists in athletics
Islamic Solidarity Games competitors for Algeria
21st-century Algerian women
20th-century Algerian women